War Eagle was the name of a Native American professional football player. He played five games in the National Football League during the 1922 season with the Oorang Indians.

References
The Oorang Indians
The Oorang Indians Pro Football hall of Fame
Ongoing Research Project Uniform Numbers of the NFL Pre-1933

Date of birth missing
Date of death missing
Native American players of American football
Oorang Indians players